Papanui is a former New Zealand parliamentary electorate. The electorate was in the northern suburbs of the city of Christchurch, and existed from 1969 to 1984.

Population centres
Through an amendment in the Electoral Act in 1965, the number of electorates in the South Island was fixed at 25, an increase of one since the 1962 electoral redistribution. It was accepted that through the more rapid population growth in the North Island, the number of its electorates would continue to increase, and to keep proportionality, three new electorates were allowed for in the 1967 electoral redistribution for the next election. In the North Island, five electorates were newly created and one electorate was reconstituted while three electorates were abolished. In the South Island, three electorates were newly created (including Papanui) and one electorate was reconstituted while three electorates were abolished. The overall effect of the required changes was highly disruptive to existing electorates, with all but three electorates having their boundaries altered.

In 1969, the electorate extended from Harewood in the west to Little Hagley Park in the south-east. In the 1972 electoral redistribution, the electorate's area slightly reduced.

History
Bert Walker had since the  been the representative of the St Albans electorate for the National Party. When the Papanui electorate was formed in 1969, he transferred to there. After three parliamentary terms for Papanui, he was defeated by Labour's Mike Moore. With the abolition of the Papanui electorate in 1984, Moore transferred to the Christchurch North electorate and briefly became Prime Minister while representing that electorate.

Members of Parliament
The electorate was represented by two members of parliament.

Key

Election results

1981 election

1978 election

1975 election

1972 election

1969 election

Notes

References

1969 establishments in New Zealand
1984 disestablishments in New Zealand
Historical electorates of New Zealand
Politics of Christchurch
History of Christchurch